Maiak (means "lighthouse" in Ukrainian) may refer to several places in Ukraine:

Crimea
Maiak, Crimea, village in Chornomorske Raion

Donetsk Oblast
Maiak (urban-type settlement), Donetsk Oblast, urban-type settlement in Makiivka Municipality
Maiak (settlement), Donetsk Oblast, rural settlement in Pokrovsk Raion